Glory Van Scott (born June 1, 1947) is an educator, writer, actress and dancer. She is a former principal dancer with the Katherine Dunham, Agnes de Mille and Talley Beatty dance companies and has performed in the United States and around the world.

Early life and education
Glory Van Scott was born on June 1, 1947 in Chicago, Illinois. The daughter of Dr. and Ms. Thomas Van Scott, she was raised near Greenwood, Mississippi. She is of African American/Choctaw and Seminole ancestry.

Van Scott was a student at Oakland Elementary School and Dunbar High School, and graduated high school at Ethical Culture H.S. in New York City. She studied art, dance, and drama classes at The Abraham Lincoln Center, in Chicago, where she met Paul Robeson and Charity Bailey. Van Scott spent summers in Ethical Culture Camp in New York.

She received a BA and MA from Goddard College and a PhD from Union Graduate School (previously known as Antioch College Union Graduate School).

Career
Van Scott was mentored in theatre by Vinnette Justine Carroll. She modelled for Wilhelmina Models and was a principal dancer for the Katherine Dunham, Agnes de Mille and Talley Beatty dance companies, as well as joining American Ballet Theatre.

She appeared in the following Broadway productions:
  House of Flowers (1954)
  Kwamina (1961)
  The Great White Hope (1968)
  Billy Noname (1970)

In 1978, she appeared on film in the featured role of the Rolls-Royce Lady in The Wiz and the 2003 film Rhythms of the Saints.

As a playwright and author, Van Scott has written and composed nine musicals including Miss Truth, and books such as Baba and the Flea (1972), and Glory: A Life Among Legends (2018).

Educator

She taught theater at the Pennsylvania Governor's School for the Arts and Theater as Social Change at Fordham University.

Legacy
Elizabeth Catlett created a bronze bust depicting Van Scott in 1981. In 2002, Van Scott received the Katherine Dunham Legacy Award.

Personal
Van Scott's cousin Emmett Till was murdered in 1955.

References

External links 
 

1947 births
20th-century American actresses
African-American actresses
American ballerinas
American stage actresses
Dancers from Illinois
Goddard College alumni
Living people
Union Institute & University alumni
20th-century African-American women
20th-century African-American people
21st-century African-American people
21st-century African-American women